Carposina autologa, the hakea seed-moth, is a moth in the Carposinidae family. It is found in Australia, where it has been recorded from Western Australia. It has been released in South Africa for the biological control Hakea sericea.

The wingspan is about 10 mm. The forewings are white with a black stripe along the costa. The hindwings are white.

The larvae feed on the seeds of Hakea sericea and Hakea nodosa.

References

Natural History Museum Lepidoptera generic names catalog

Carposinidae
Lepidoptera used as pest control agents